Siim Tenno (born 4 August 1990) is an Estonian footballer who plays for German Oberliga Niedersachsen club MTV Gifhorn as a midfielder.

Club career
Tenno, Tartu Tammeka youth product, started his men's league career with club's third team in the II Liiga in 2007. The next season, he played 29 matches for the club's second team and was promoted to the first team for the 2009 season.

Viktoria Žižkov
In January 2012, he and teammate Kaarel Kiidron were loaned to Czech Republic club Viktoria Žižkov until the end of the season. He made the first team debut on 30 March 2012, when he came on as a late substitute.

Narva Trans
In the start of 2014 season, Tenno signed a one-year contract with Meistriliiga club Narva Trans. Before that he went on trial to 2. Bundesliga club Paderborn. Good spell in Narva helped him to sign a contract with German Regionalliga club Neumünster.

Neumünster
At the start of July, Siim Tenno was with his former teammate Reio Laabus together in VfR Neumünster and both signed contracts.

Tartu Tammeka 
On 21 July 2015, Tenno rejoined Tammeka.

MTV Gifhorn
In January 2016, Tenno joined German Oberliga Niedersachsen club MTV Gifhorn.

International career
He made his international debut for Estonia in 2011.

Personal life
His brother, Simo, is also a footballer.

References

External links

1990 births
Living people
Estonian footballers
Sportspeople from Tartu
Estonia international footballers
Estonian expatriate footballers
Expatriate footballers in the Czech Republic
Estonian expatriate sportspeople in the Czech Republic
FK Viktoria Žižkov players
Tartu JK Tammeka players
JK Narva Trans players
VfR Neumünster players
Expatriate footballers in Germany
Estonian expatriate sportspeople in Germany
Association football midfielders